Leland Speed (October 20, 1899 – August 8, 1971) was an investment banker and former mayor of Jackson, Mississippi and the husband of Katherine Ettl.

Biography 
Speed was born on October 20, 1899, in Covington County, Mississippi, to Joseph W. and Nebraska Pickering Speed. He received a business degree from Bowling Green College. He ran for mayor successfully in 1945, defeating incumbent Walter Scott. He ran again in 1949, but was defeated by Allen C. Thompson. He died of "an apparent heart attack" at his home in Jackson on August 8, 1971.

The library at Mississippi College is named after Speed. The funds for the library were given by his children.

Personal life 
Speed married Katherine Rhymes in 1931. They had five children: Leland Rhymes (1932-2021), James (1934-1935), Joseph Liston, Shellie (Speed) Bartlett, and Lake Chambers (1948-).

References

Mayors of Jackson, Mississippi
1899 births
1971 deaths
People from Covington County, Mississippi
American investment bankers